SCIC may refer to:

 Directorate-General for Interpretation, abbreviated after its former French name Service Commun Interprétation-Conférences
 Société Centrale Immobilière de la Caisse des dépôts, the predecessor of real-estate investment company Icade
 the Supreme Council of Islamic Courts, another name for the Islamic Courts Union
 State Capital Investment Corporation, a state-owned company in Vietnam
 Scic, an Italian road bicycle racing team 1969–1979
 Spinal Cord Injury Centre